East End Historic District is a national historic district located at Ahoskie, Hertford County, North Carolina.  The district encompasses 27 contributing buildings and 1 contributing structure in a predominantly African-American residential section of Ahoskie. The buildings include notable examples of Colonial Revival architecture.  Notable buildings include the 12 buildings and racetrack at the Atlantic District Fairgrounds and 3 brick buildings at the Robert L. Vann Elementary and High School complex.

It was listed on the National Register of Historic Places in 2008.

References

African-American history of North Carolina
Historic districts on the National Register of Historic Places in North Carolina
Colonial Revival architecture in North Carolina
Buildings and structures in Hertford County, North Carolina
National Register of Historic Places in Hertford County, North Carolina